Vijaypur Assembly constituency (formerly, Bijaypur and Bijeypur) is one of the 230 Vidhan Sabha (Legislative Assembly) constituencies of Madhya Pradesh state in central India. This constituency came into existence in 1951, as Bijaypur, one of the 79 Vidhan Sabha constituencies of the erstwhile Madhya Bharat state.

Vijaypur (constituency number 1) is one of the two Vidhan Sabha constituencies located in Sheopur district. This constituency covers the entire Vijaypur and Karahal sub-divisions of the district.

Vijaypur is part of Morena Lok Sabha constituency.

Members of Legislative Assembly
As a constituency of Madhya Bharat:
 1951: Balmukund, Indian National Congress
As a constituency of Madhya Pradesh:
 1957: Did not exist.
 1962: Naval Kishore, Independent
 1967: Jagmohan Singh, Independent
 1972: Jagmohan Singh, Bharatiya Jana Sangh 
 1977: Ajit Kumar, Janata Party
 1980: Jagmohan Singh, Indian National Congress (I)
 1985: Babulal Mewara, Bharatiya Janata Party
 1990: Ramnivas Rawat, Indian National Congress
 1993: Ramnivas Rawat, Indian National Congress
 1998: Babulal Mewara, Bharatiya Janata Party
 2003: Ramnivas Rawat, Indian National Congress
 2008: Ramnivas Rawat, Indian National Congress 
 2013: Ramnivas Rawat, Indian National Congress
 2018: Sitaram Adiwasi, Bhartiya Janata Party

Election results

2013 results

References

Sheopur district
Assembly constituencies of Madhya Pradesh